Dimitrios Ioannidis (born 13 February 2000) is a Greek professional footballer who plays as a midfielder. Born in Germany, he has made one appearance for the Greece U19 national team.

Club career
On 28 May 2019, Ioannidis signed his first professional contract with Fortuna Sittard. He made his professional debut with Fortuna Sittard in a 4–0 Eredivisie loss to AZ Alkmaar on 4 August 2019.

International career
Born in Germany, Ioannidis is of Greek descent. He represents Greece as a youth international.

References

External links
 
 
 Fortuna Sittard Profile

2000 births
Living people
German people of Greek descent
Sportspeople of Greek descent
Citizens of Greece through descent
Footballers from Essen
Greek footballers
German footballers
Association football midfielders
Greece youth international footballers
Fortuna Sittard players
Sportfreunde Lotte players
Rot Weiss Ahlen players
Eredivisie players
Regionalliga players
Greek expatriate footballers
German expatriate footballers
Greek expatriate sportspeople in the Netherlands
German expatriate sportspeople in the Netherlands
Expatriate footballers in the Netherlands